St Thomas the Martyr is a former Church of England parish church on St Thomas Street in the Redcliffe district of the English port city of Bristol.

It has a 14th-century tower, but the nave was rebuilt 1791–93 by James Allen. A substantial reordering was carried out by William Venn Gough between 1878 and 1880, and the top of the tower was remodeled with spirelet, pinnacles, and pierced parapet by Gough in 1896–97.

Four paintings for the reredos were commissioned from the German artist Fritz von Kamptz in 1906, and are now housed in the south aisle.

Although the church survived the Bristol Blitz of the Second World War, the congregation declined after the war and the church was finally declared redundant. It is in the care of the Churches Conservation Trust, having been vested in the Trust on 17 February 1988.

The organ was built by John Harris in 1729, and attracted the admiration of Handel.

It is recorded in the National Heritage List for England as a designated Grade II* listed building.

Archives
Parish records for St Thomas the Martyr church, Bristol are held at Bristol Archives (Ref. P. St T) (online catalogue) including baptism, marriage and burial registers. The archive also includes records of the incumbent, churchwardens, overseer of the poor, parochial church council, charities, societies, waywarden and vestry plus deeds, plans and photographs.

Current usage
The building is currently leased by the Churches Conservation Trust to a Romanian Orthodox Church community who use it for worship on Sundays and special days. Otherwise it is available for hire.

See also
 Churches in Bristol
 Grade II* listed buildings in Bristol
 List of churches preserved by the Churches Conservation Trust in South West England

References

Grade II* listed churches in Bristol
14th-century church buildings in England
Saint Thomas the Martyr
Churches preserved by the Churches Conservation Trust
Saint Thomas the Martyr
Romanian Orthodox churches in the United Kingdom